David Wiremu Houpapa (born 14 November 1981) is a former New Zealand first-class cricketer active 2006–2008 who played for Auckland. He was born in Newman, Western Australia.

References

1981 births
Living people
New Zealand cricketers
Auckland cricketers
People from the Pilbara
21st-century New Zealand people